Sam Straley (born July 13, 1995) is an American actor.

Early life and education 
Born and raised in Cincinnati, Ohio. Straley studied in Anderson High School until his graduation in 2013. He graduated from The Theatre School at DePaul University in 2017.

Career 
Straley started his acting career in 2016, shortly before graduating from college. He bagged the roles of Nathan Ward and Tyler Whitlock in the television series Chicago P.D. which was produced by Dick Wolf for Wolf Entertainment. 

He played as Bully 1 in the sci-fi series Electric Dreams, then as Archie Kinsler in the film Bernadette alongside James Guyton and John Psathas,  and finally, in the television sitcom, The Kids Are Alright as Lawrence Cleary.  

In 2022, Sam starred in the miniseries The Dropout, which is set to premiere on Hulu on March 3, 2022. Also, he is part of the cast of the docu-comedy Welcome to Flatch, which will premiere on Fox on March 17, 2022.

Filmography

Film

Television

References

External links

Living people
American male actors
Actors from Cincinnati
Male actors from Cincinnati
Actors from Ohio
Male actors from Ohio
Year of birth missing (living people)